Saturnina Rizal Mercado de Hidalgo (June 4, 1850 – September 14, 1913; née Rizal Mercado y Alonso Realonda), or simply Saturnina Hidalgo, was the eldest sister of Philippine national hero José Rizal. She was married to Manuel T. Hidalgo, a native and one of the richest persons in Tanauan, Batangas. She was known as Neneng.

Because of his early interest in obstetrics, Saturnina, along with her mother and eight sisters, shared health concerns and sought medical advice from her brother José. While he ultimately chose a different path, the females of the family encouraged Rizal in the direction of gynecology and obstetrics because of the high rates of maternal death and sickness from various women's diseases Filipinas experienced. In one letter, Hidalgo wrote: I am sending you news that I now have two children, the eldest is Alfredo, next is Adela, and now I am eight months pregnant. Study well how you may be of assistance to our situation, certainly with so many of us there will always be someone suffering the hardships of this sickness.An article documenting the emergence of Western medicine in the Philippines and healthcare consumption among wealthy Filipinas around the turn of the 20th century discussed gynecologist Felipe Zamora's diagnosis that Hidalgo possessed a "swollen, out of place, and dirty" uterus.

While, in 1890, she initially begged her brother, José, to remedy the political situation in which her husband, whom she called Maneng, became deported to Bohol for his alliance with Rizal, a letter from later that year revealed her change of heart. When her husband was sent into exile a second time, this time to Mindoro, she assured Rizal she had refrained from crying. She wrote: "I have been inured to the pain of separation, especially when I consider that all this cruelty and misfortune will be for the good of all. My faith has become stronger because of everything you told me." 

In 1909, Hidalgo published the first Tagalog/Filipino translation (by Pascual H. Poblete) of her brother's revolutionary novel Noli Me Tángere, thus ensuring Rizal's words became accessible, beyond elite Spanish-speaking circles, to the common Filipino.

She died on September 14, 1913.

Media portrayal
 Portrayed by Gina Alajar in the 1998 film, Jose Rizal.
 Portrayed by Sue Prado in the 2014 TV series, Ilustrado.

Ancestry

References

1850 births
1913 deaths
People from Calamba, Laguna
José Rizal